Wilson Armistead (30 August 181918 February 1868) was a British Quaker merchant, slavery abolitionist and author from Leeds, in the West Riding of Yorkshire. He led the Leeds Anti-Slavery Association and wrote and edited anti-slavery texts. His best known work, A Tribute for the Negro, was published in 1848 in which he describes slavery as "the most extensive and extraordinary system of crime the world ever witnessed". In 1851 he hosted Ellen and William Craft, including them on the census return as 'fugitive slaves' in an act that has been described as "guerrilla inscription".

Early life 
Wilson Armistead was born in Leeds on 30 August 1819 to Joseph and Hannah Armistead and grew up in Holbeck where his family's flax and mustard business was located at Water Hall. The Quaker meeting house was very close by in Water Lane, and in the words of Wilfred Allott the Armistead family had long been "faithful Friends". Armistead married Mary Bragg in 1844 and their first child, a son called Joseph John was born in 1846. The couple would go on to have a further four children, two more sons and two daughters.

Intellectual life and activism 

By the 1840s Armistead was active in the family business and eventually would head the firm. At this time, he was raising a young family and increasingly involved in abolitionist activity. He was a member of the Leeds Library, a private subscription library founded in 1768 which provided him with both a professional and ideological network. 

The Leeds Anti Slavery Association was founded in 1853 with Armistead as its president and his wife as librarian. Five years previously in 1848 Armistead had published his most influential work A Tribute for the Negro which, as of 2020, was still used as an academic text to teach about the abolition of slavery.  

In June 1850 Armistead visited the United States where he met prominent abolitionist William Lloyd Garrison as well as Ellen and William Craft, slaves from Macon, Georgia who had escaped to the North in 1848. Soon afterwards the Crafts were forced to escape to England after the Fugitive Slave Act was passed in September 1850 and their former masters sent agents to Boston after them. While in England the Crafts undertook a lecture tour and were accommodated by Wilson and Mary Armistead in 1851 when the census was taken. As head of the household, Wilson Armistead recorded his guests as “fugitive slaves” which was covered extensively in the press of the day as an unusual act of abolitionist activism.

A second book, God’s Image in Ebony, was published in 1854 while he edited a collection of abolitionist writing, 500,000 Strokes For Freedom in 1853. He later published a book in 1867, Life of Anthony Benezet.  He also wrote on subjects other than the abolition of slavery such as Tales and Legends of the English Lakes and Mountains.

According to prominent African-American abolitionist William Wells Brown "Few English gentlemen have done more to hasten the day of the slave’s liberation than Wilson Armistead".

References

External links 

 A Tribute for the Negro, hosted by Documenting the American South, University of North Carolina
 Tales and Legends of the English Lakes and Mountains on Project Gutenberg
 God’s Image in Ebony, hosted by Documenting the American South, University of North Carolina

British abolitionists
1819 births
1868 deaths
People from Leeds
19th-century Quakers
English Quakers
19th-century English writers
Quaker writers
Quaker abolitionists